Concord  High School is a co-educational high school located in  in Sydney, Australia. The school has over 1200 students and approximately 90 teachers.

Houses
There are 5 houses at Concord named after local landmarks of the Parramatta River: Brays (Blue), Kendall (Purple), Kings (Red), Majors (Green) and Yaralla (Yellow). Its swimming carnival is normally held at the Harold Holt Memorial Swimming Centre.

Sporting, extra-curricular activities and music
Concord is widely associated with sporting. It is located near St. Lukes Oval, a multipurpose sporting ground with a 400m grass track, Five Dock Leisure Centre and Gym, Cintra Netball and Tennis Courts and Concord Football Oval. Its BASS (Before and After School Sports) Program consists of the following sports:

Before school:
 Strength and Fitness
 Futsal (Yrs. 7–11)

 
 Table tennis

After school:
 Basketball
 Tennis
 Soccer
 Volleyball
 Badminton
 Touch football

Other extra-curricular activities provided by, and through the school, include the following:

Lunchtime activities:
 Robotics Club
 Debating Club
 
Music
 The school has a String Ensemble, Concert Band, Stage Band, Concert Band, and a Choir.

References
http://www.smh.com.au/national/education/student-banned-from-hsc-study-session-due-to-her-hair-colour-20140617-zsatd.html

External links
 Concord High School website

Public high schools in Sydney
Concord, New South Wales
Educational institutions established in 1981
1981 establishments in Australia